ISO 39001:2012 Road traffic safety (RTS) management systems - Requirements with guidance for use is an ISO standard for a management system (similar to ISO 9000) for road traffic safety. The implementation of the standard is intended to enable organizations to improve their traffic safety and to reduce the number of persons killed or seriously injured. 

Development of the standard began in February 2008 and the first edition was published on October 1, 2012. It is under the responsibility of the ISO Technical Committee "ISO/TC 241".

Scope and background
This Standard is applicable to public and private organizations that interact with the road traffic system.

This International Standard is applicable to any organization that wishes to:
 establish, implement, maintain and improve an RTS management system
 assure itself of conformity with its stated RTS policy
 demonstrate conformity with this International Standard

The organization must have a process, that
 observes/evaluates the accident numbers, numbers of killed and injured persons ...
 provides a continuous improvement of the traffic safety
 observes and evaluates events, that are in connection with the road traffic safety

Performance factors
In section 6 "planning" there is a list of "performance factors" that covers among other things, the following:

a) Risk exposure factors

 Traffic volume and traffic mileage by vehicle and road user type
 Volume of product and/or service provided by the organization

b) Final safety outcome factors

 The number of deaths and serious injuries

c) Intermediate safety outcome factors

- The safe planning, design, operation and use of the road network
 Road design and safe speed especially considering separation (on-coming traffic and vulnerable road users such as pedestrians, cyclists, and horse riders), side areas and intersection design
 Use of appropriate roads depending on vehicle type, user, type of cargo and equipment
 Use of personal safety equipment especially considering seat belts, child restraints, bicycle helmets, motorcycle helmets, and the means to see and be seen
 Using safe driving speed also considering vehicle type, traffic and weather conditions
 Fitness of drivers especially considering fatigue, distraction, alcohol and drugs
 Safe journey planning including consideration of the need to travel, the amount and mode of travel and choice of route, vehicle and driver
- The safe entry and exit of vehicles and road users to the road network
 Safe vehicles especially considering the occupant protection, protection of other road users (vulnerable as well as other vehicle occupants), road traffic crash avoidance and mitigation, road worthiness, vehicle load capacity and securing of loads in and on the vehicle.
 Appropriate authorization to drive/ride the class of vehicles being driven/ridden
 Removal of unfit vehicles and drivers/riders from the road network
- The recovery and rehabilitation of road traffic crash victims from the road network
 Post crash response and first aid, emergency preparedness and post crash recovery and rehabilitation.

Contents
The ISO 39001 will consist of following sections:
 Introduction
 Scope
 Normative References
 Terms and Definitions
 Context of the organisation
 Leadership
 Planning
 Support
 Operation
 Performance Evaluation
 Improvement
 Annex (informative): Guidance on the use of this International Standard

Certification
A number of ISO 39001 certification has increased since 2012. For example, 
 More than 60 companies got certified to ISO 39001 by JQA in Japan. 
 In Korea, Korea Postal Logistics Agency (POLA) got certified to ISO 39001 by KFQ for the first time. 
 ISO reports that 41 organizations affiliated to the Swedish Association of Road Transport Companies had been certified to ISO 39001 by August 2013 – a figure expected to rise to 100 by 2014.
 Spain: first public transport company to be certified to ISO 39001
 South Africa: 72 transport fleets representing some 4 600 trucks and buses certified to the RTMS standard will also adopt ISO 39001.

External links
 ISO Homepage

39001
Road traffic management
Road safety